Rottman is a surname. Notable people with the surname include:

Stormy Rottman (1918–1993), American weather forecaster and television host
Gordon L. Rottman (born 1947), American author
Ryan Rottman (born 1978), American television actor

See also
23851 Rottman-Yang, main-belt asteroid
Rottmann
Rotman (disambiguation)
Rotman School of Management